Budjala is a rural locality in the Province of Sud-Ubangi in the Democratic Republic of the Congo. It is the seat of Budjala Territory.

See also 

 List of cities in the Democratic Republic of the Congo

References 

Populated places in Sud-Ubangi